Glen Murphy  (born 6 April 1957) is a British actor and producer, best known as Firefighter George Green between 1988 and 2002 on the television drama London's Burning.

Career 
Murphy was the only actor to remain throughout the entire run of London's Burning, which attracted 18.92 million viewers for its 5th series, and averaging 15 million in its 14-year reign. He was the subject of This Is Your Life in 1992. After London's Burning he appeared in The Bill, Tank Malling, the Karl Howman directed drama Fathers of Girls, and alongside Joely Richardson in Shoreditch.

His later work includes as a producer and lead actor in the film Lords of London (2014). It won best film at the New York Hell's Kitchen Film Festival, and he won the best Actor award at the Abruzzo film festival in Italy; it is released in the United States by Lionsgate on 1 September 2015. 

In 2020, he appeared in the Freddie Mills biopic Finger of Suspicion. He had a leading role in the  Royal National Theatre production of Patrick Marber's Dealer's Choice (Writers Guild Award & Evening Standard Awards) in the West End of London in 1995. Glen played the lead in the national tour of A Gentle Hook in 2004-05.

Early life 
He attended St Bonaventure's Catholic School in Forest Gate. He won London & Essex championships in Football & Boxing in his youth also Boxing Internationally, Murphy has a 3rd Dan Black Belt in karate and trained in martial arts for over 30 years. His brother, Darren Murphy, was in the punk band Wasted Youth.

His career began in the play "Johnny Boxer" at Half Moon Theatre in Alie St, East London and then on to a Guilty Generation, staged at his father Terry's pub Bridge House in Canning Town. and then off down the road to Theatre Royal in Stratford, London in their TIE Company Theatre Venture for a year.

Awards 

He was awarded the Freedom of the City of London in 1995. He was awarded a Member of the Order of the British Empire in 2007 for his charity work.

References

External links
Official website (archived March 5, 2016)

English male stage actors
Living people
Members of the Order of the British Empire
English male television actors
1957 births
People from West Ham
Male actors from London
People educated at St Bonaventure's Catholic School
People from Canning Town